Red Joan is a 2018 British spy drama film, directed by Trevor Nunn, from a screenplay by Lindsay Shapero. The film stars Sophie Cookson, Stephen Campbell Moore, Tom Hughes, Ben Miles, Nina Sosanya, Tereza Srbova, and Judi Dench.

The film is based on a novel of the same name written by Jennie Rooney, which was itself inspired by the life of Melita Norwood. Norwood worked at the British Non-Ferrous Metals Research Association as a secretary and supplied the Soviet Union with nuclear secrets. The materials that Norwood betrayed to the USSR hastened the pace at which the Soviets developed nuclear bomb technology.

Red Joan had its world premiere at the Toronto International Film Festival on 7 September 2018 and was released on 19 April 2019, by Lionsgate in the United Kingdom.

Plot
The young Joan Smith is studying physics at Cambridge University. She becomes involved with Socialists and radical politics through her friends, Sonya and Leo Galich, German Jews. Sonya and Leo Galich are cousins, but the former grew up with the latter after she was orphaned and their relationship is more like that of a brother and a sister. Through Sonya, Smith meets and falls in love with the intense intellectual, Leo.

Joan is recruited to work for the wartime Tube Alloys project to build an atomic bomb for Britain and meets the scientist, Max. Leo tries to recruit Joan to spy for the Soviet Union, but she rejects his appeal and ends her relationship with him, accusing him of using her. Joan falls in love with Max, but their relationship ends when Max tells her that he wants Joan as his wife, not his mistress, but, because of Britain's strict divorce laws, he is unable to divorce his wife. In 1945, Joan is appalled by the atomic bombings of the Japanese cities of Hiroshima and Nagasaki, and is frightened when it is suggested that Britain develop its own atomic bombs to possibly use against the Soviet Union. Joan contacts the Galiches to provide information about the British nuclear programme to the Soviet Union.

In an atmosphere of Cold War suspicion and paranoia, Joan finds her work increasingly difficult. After she again accuses Leo of using her, he dies, apparently a suicide, although it is later suggested he was murdered. Sonya flees Britain and Joan learns that Sonya's child was Leo's. The revelation of this relationship between the Galiches adds to Joan's sense of betrayal, and she returns to Max. After the Soviet Union explodes its first atomic bomb in 1949, Max is arrested by Scotland Yard and is charged with espionage for the Soviet Union. Joan visits Max in prison where he informs her that his wife has agreed to a divorce. Joan in turn tearfully confesses to Max that she provided the intelligence that led to his being charged, but he forgives her. Joan blackmails Sir William Mitchell, a high-ranking diplomat who is really a Soviet spy, to help Max. As a result, Max is released from prison. Joan and Max go to Australia, but return to Britain at some point.

In 2000, Joan is arrested and charged with espionage. She is interrogated by two detectives from Scotland Yard, whom she accuses of misunderstanding her life, but gradually concedes that she did provide information to the Soviets. The tabloid press goes into a "feeding frenzy" and vilifies her as a traitor, calling her "Red Joan". Her lawyer son, Nick Stanley, first agrees to defend her but then disavows her when he learns that she did provide intelligence to the Soviet Union. Finally, Joan is able to convince him that her actions were motivated only by the desire to stop nuclear weapons being used again and he agrees to defend her, standing by her as she faces the tabloid journalists outside her home.

Cast

Production
The film stars Judi Dench and Sophie Cookson, and is directed by Trevor Nunn. David Parfitt is the producer, and the screenplay is by Lindsay Shapero.

Release
The film had its world première at the Toronto International Film Festival on 7 September 2018. Shortly after, IFC Films acquired U.S. distribution rights to the film. It was released in the United States and in the United Kingdom on 19 April 2019.

Box office
Red Joan grossed $1.6 million in the United States and Canada and $8.2 million in other countries for a worldwide total of $9.8 million.

Critical response
The site's critics consensus reads, "A fascinating real-life story dramatized in perplexingly dull fashion, Red Joan wastes its tale's incredible intrigue – as well as the formidable talents of Judi Dench." Metacritic reports a normalized score of 45 out of 100, based on 22 critics, indicating "mixed or average reviews". A review in The Guardian said that the film "can't disguise its mediocrity", and that the film "squanders its greatest acting asset". A critic in The Telegraph agreed that "Judi Dench is wasted in this absurd portrayal..."

References

External links
 
 

2018 films
British spy drama films
Drama films based on actual events
Films based on British novels
Films directed by Trevor Nunn
Films produced by David Parfitt
Films scored by George Fenton
Lionsgate films
IFC Films films
Films set in 1938
Films set in 2000
2010s spy drama films
2018 drama films
2010s English-language films
2010s British films